The first Zaia government, led by president Luca Zaia, was the government of Veneto from 19 April 2010 to 29 June 2015.

Governments of Veneto
2010 establishments in Italy